Gabber is the style of electronic dance music and a subgenre of hardcore techno, as well as the surrounding subculture.

Gabber may also refer to:

Computing 
 Gabber (instant messaging client), a free software and open-source GNOME client for instant messaging XMPP network.

People with the surname
 Ofer Gabber, a French mathematician.

See also
 Gab (disambiguation)
 Gabba (disambiguation)
 Jabber (disambiguation)